South Woods State Prison is a state prison for male offenders located in Bridgeton, Cumberland County, New Jersey, United States. It is operated by the New Jersey Department of Corrections.

History
In the 1990s state officials planned to open a new prison in southern New Jersey. Officials planned to select one of several proposed sites in Camden County, Cumberland County, and Gloucester County. State officials narrowed the proposed sites to Bridgeton and Millville in Cumberland County. In 1992 officials said that they selected Bridgeton over Millville as the site for the proposed prison.

South Woods State Prison opened in 1997 and is the newest, as well as the largest, prison in New Jersey. When officials from the City of Bridgeton heard of a state report proposing to move over 1,000 prisoners from Riverfront State Prison in Camden to South Woods, Bridgeton officials opposed the plans.

There were 3,363 inmates of various custodial levels as of 2010.

Facilities
The Bureau of State Use Industry operates footwear, clothing, printing/graphics, signs and decals/binders shops at the facility.

See also

 List of New Jersey state prisons
 List of law enforcement agencies in New Jersey
 List of United States state correction agencies
 Prison

References

External links
South Woods State Prison, New Jersey Department of Corrections
New Jersey Department of Corrections

1997 establishments in New Jersey
Bridgeton, New Jersey
Prisons in New Jersey
Buildings and structures in Cumberland County, New Jersey